Thomas Hong-Chi Lee (born March 5, 1945) is a Taiwanese-American historian of Chinese education and related aspects of traditional Chinese culture. He has taught world history and early modern European intellectual history in the US, as well as in Taiwan and in China.

Education 
Lee was born in Taiwan and was educated at National Tainan First Senior High School and then National Taiwan University (1964–68). He then attended graduate school at Yale University, where he worked mainly with Arthur F. Wright, but also took courses from Jonathan Spence, Franklin L. Baumer, Jaroslav Pelikan, and Peter Gay, writing a Ph.D. thesis on education in Northern Song China (960–1126).

Career
He taught at The Chinese University of Hong Kong, from 1974 to 1991. After 1991 he taught at The City College of New York, and the Graduate Center, both of The City University of New York until he took an early retirement to return to Taiwan (in 2007). He served as a visiting professor in Taiwan, China, and Germany, and has given lectures in China, Japan, Korea, Germany, as well as the US and Taiwan. He retired from National Tsing Hua University of Taiwan in 2015.

Publications
His major publications include two books on Chinese education, each on the Song dynasty, and on traditional China (from the first millennium BCE to the 17th century CE). Both are in English and then translated into Chinese. The Chinese version of the latter has been awarded the “Outstanding Achievement in Sinology” Prize (2015) and then “Wenjin" Prize of the National Library of China (2017). This work is also widely circulated in Japan, where he has been acclaimed as “The first person today in the scholarship of Chinese education and examinations.”

Lee has also published on Song Chinese historical thought and on Sino-European cultural relations, as well as many articles in academic journals. After retirement in 2015, he has been writing as a public intellectual, and has given three Lecture Series on modern European thought in the prestigious TSMC Foundation Lecture Series (2014, 2015 and 2017) in Taiwan. His essays on contemporary intellectual matters in Taiwan and China are regularly featured in Alumni Bimonthly of National Taiwan University and in the web-journal, Voicettank.org (思想坦克).

Bibliography

Books

As editor

Chinese publications

As editor

As translator

Notes

External links
 History Institute of National Tsing-Hua University
 TSMC Foundation Lectures on the Renaissance
 TSMC Foundation Lectures on the Reformation
 TSMC Foundation Lectures on the Enlightenment
 School of Education Website of Beijing Normal University

Living people
National Taiwan University alumni
Yale University alumni
1945 births
Historians of China
People with acquired American citizenship
Taiwanese emigrants to the United States
City College of New York faculty
Taiwanese male writers
21st-century Taiwanese historians
20th-century Taiwanese historians
21st-century American historians
21st-century American male writers
Academic staff of the National Tsing Hua University
Taiwanese expatriates in Hong Kong
American writers of Taiwanese descent
American expatriate academics
American academics of Taiwanese descent
Academic staff of the Chinese University of Hong Kong
American expatriates in Hong Kong
Graduate Center, CUNY faculty
American historians of education
American male non-fiction writers